The Surface Transportation Corporation was the bus-operating subsidiary of the Third Avenue Railway in New York City which operated under that name following the conversion of the streetcar lines in Manhattan and the Bronx to bus service between March 1941 and August 1948. On December 17, 1956, the corporation was bought by Fifth Avenue Coach Lines, Inc. (formerly New York City Omnibus Corporation) as part of its acquisition of the Third Avenue Railway, and its routes placed under a newly created operating subsidiary, Surface Transit, Inc.

Bus routes

Surface Transportation inherited the following former trolley lines:
M100: Broadway-Kingsbridge Line
M101: Third Avenue-Amsterdam Avenue Line 
M102: 125th Street Crosstown Line 
M103: 59th Street Crosstown Line 
M104: Broadway Line
M105: Tenth Avenue Line 
M106: 42nd Street Crosstown Line

References

External links
Surface Transportation System (BusTalk U.S. Surface Transportation Galleries)

Bus transportation in New York City
Third Avenue Railway